Defending champion Andy Murray defeated Roger Federer in the final, 7–5, 7–5 to win the men's singles tennis title at the 2010 Canadian Open. Murray became the first player since Andre Agassi in 1995 to defend the title. It was also the first time in the tournament's history that the top four seeds (in this case the Big Four) reached the semifinals.

Seeds
The top eight seeds receive a bye into the second round.

Qualifying

Main draw

Finals

Top half

Section 1

Section 2

Bottom half

Section 3

Section 4

References

External links
Main Draw
Qualifying Draw

Rogers Cup
Singles